

Drug use and deaths per state

References